The W.E. O'Bryant Bell Tower occupies a prominent central position on the campus of the University of Arkansas at Pine Bluff in Pine Bluff, Arkansas.  It is a three-stage brick structure, with open arches at the base where a fountain once stood.  The second stage houses a belfry, and the third a clock.  The corners are buttressed, and the levels divided by bands of concrete.  The tower was built in 1943–47.

The tower was listed on the National Register of Historic Places in 1998.

See also

National Register of Historic Places listings in Jefferson County, Arkansas

References

Buildings and structures completed in 1943
Buildings and structures in Pine Bluff, Arkansas
Buildings and structures on the National Register of Historic Places in Arkansas
National Register of Historic Places in Pine Bluff, Arkansas
Towers in Arkansas
University of Arkansas at Pine Bluff